Cedric Henderson (born October 3, 1965) is an American former professional basketball player.

A 6'8" forward, Henderson played at the University of Georgia during the 1980s and was selected by the Atlanta Hawks in the second round of the 1986 NBA Draft. He split the 1986-87 NBA season with the Hawks and Milwaukee Bucks, averaging 1.4 points and 1.0 rebounds in 8 games.

References

External links
NBA career stats

1965 births
Living people
Albany Patroons players
American expatriate basketball people in France
American expatriate basketball people in Italy
American men's basketball players
Atlanta Hawks draft picks
Atlanta Hawks players
Basketball players from Marietta, Georgia
Georgia Bulldogs basketball players
Milwaukee Bucks players
Olimpia Milano players
Power forwards (basketball)
Quad City Thunder players